Aciagrion gracile (graceful slim) is a species of damselfly in the family Coenagrionidae. It is found in Angola, Botswana, Ivory Coast, Gambia, Malawi, Mozambique, Nigeria, Tanzania, Uganda, Zambia, Zimbabwe, and possibly Kenya.

Taxonomy
Aciagrion gracile, Aciagrion hamoni and Aciagrion pinheyi have many similarities; the taxonomy and identification of this group requires revision.

Habitat
Its natural habitats are subtropical or tropical dry forests, dry savanna, moist savanna, rivers, intermittent rivers, shrub-dominated wetlands, swamps, freshwater marshes, and intermittent freshwater marshes.

Gallery

References

External links

Coenagrionidae
Insects described in 1909
Taxonomy articles created by Polbot